Ingo Weißenborn (born 29 November 1963) is a German fencer. He won a gold medal in the team foil event at the 1992 Summer Olympics.

References

External links
 

1963 births
Living people
German male fencers
Olympic fencers of Germany
Fencers at the 1992 Summer Olympics
Olympic gold medalists for Germany
Olympic medalists in fencing
Sportspeople from Saxony-Anhalt
Medalists at the 1992 Summer Olympics